West of the Rockies is a 1929 American western silent film directed by Horace B. Carpenter, starring Art Mix, Horace B. Carpenter, and George Edward Brown.

Cast
 Art Mix as Bob Strong
 Horace B. Carpenter as Hair-Trigger Strong
 George Edward Brown as George
 Cliff Lyons as Snakey Rogers
 Bud Osborne as Juan Escobar
 Fontaine La Rue as Celia de la Costa
 Inez Gomez as Rosita
 Ione Reed as Beth Lee
 Alfred Hewston as Tex
 Pete Crawford as Sheriff
 Antone Sanchez as Pedro

References

1929 films
American silent films
American black-and-white films